The All-Nepal Women's Association (Revolutionary) (ANWA[R]) is a Nepalese women's political organization that is aligned with the ruling Communist Party of Nepal (Maoist).

Communist Party of Nepal (Maoist Centre)
Maoist organisations in Nepal
Women's wings of communist parties
Women's organisations based in Nepal